The 1885 Rhode Island gubernatorial election was held on April 1, 1885. Republican nominee George P. Wetmore defeated Democratic nominee Ziba O. Slocum with 55.97% of the vote.

General election

Candidates
Major party candidates
George P. Wetmore, Republican
Ziba O. Slocum, Democratic

Other candidates
George H. Slade, Prohibition

Results

References

1885
Rhode Island
Gubernatorial